Ragubhir Saini (born 8 September 1939) is an Indian former cricketer. He played 26 first-class matches for Delhi between 1959 and 1969.

See also
 List of Delhi cricketers

References

External links
 

1939 births
Living people
Indian cricketers
Delhi cricketers
Cricketers from Delhi